VKG Elektrivõrgud (VKG EV, former name: Narva Elektrivõrgud) is an electricity distribution company in Estonia. It is a subsidiary of Viru Keemia Grupp. VKG Elektrivõrgud is the second-largest power distribution company in Estonia, after Eesti Energia Jaotusvõrk.

History
The history of the company reaches back to 1952 when it was established as a unit of Eesti Energia. It was established on 1 January 1993 as an independent company Narva Elektrivõrk, a subsidiary of Eesti Energia. Narva Elektrivõrk separated from Eesti Energia in 1997 and in 1998–1999 was sold to Startekor, a company controlled by Cinergy Corporation. In 2002–2003, the company was acquired by Sthenos Group and ECE European City Estates AG. In July 2006, Narva Elektrivõrk became a subsidiary of Viru Keemia Grupp and was renamed VKG Elektrivõrgud.

Operations
VKG Elektrivõrgud distributes and sells electricity, and also provides operational management services for company power systems. Additionally, the company provides the service of designing, building, repairing, using, checking and maintaining electrical installations through VKG Elektriehitus.

The company's service area is in Ida-Viru County, including Narva, Narva-Jõesuu, Sillamäe, Vaivara Parish and Viivikonna district of Kohtla-Järve. It has 35,000 customers and an annual sales of 262 GWh of electricity.

See also

 Energy in Estonia

References

External links
Official website

Electric power companies of Estonia
Narva
Energy companies established in 1993
Estonian companies established in 1993